A strong typhoon is the lowest category used by the Japan Meteorological Agency (JMA) to classify tropical cyclones that has reached typhoon intensity in the Northwest Pacific basin. The basin is limited to the north of the equator between the 100th meridian east and the 180th meridian. The category of a strong typhoon is defined as a tropical cyclone that has 10-minute sustained wind speeds between 64 and 84 knots (118–116 km/h; 74–97 mph).

Background

The Northwest Pacific basin covers a vast area in the Pacific Ocean, located north of the equator, between 100°E and 180°E. Several weather agencies monitor this basin, however it is officially monitored by the Japan Meteorological Agency (JMA, RSMC Tokyo), who is responsible for forecasting, naming and issuing warnings for tropical cyclones. Unofficially, the Joint Typhoon Warning Center also monitors the basin, however these warnings measures 1-minute sustained wind speeds, comparing their scale to the Saffir–Simpson scale. The JMA uses a simpler scale on classifying tropical cyclones adapted by the ESCAP/WMO Typhoon Committee measuring 10-minute sustained wind speeds, ranging from a tropical depression, tropical storm, severe tropical storm and typhoon. Furthermore, the JMA divides the typhoon category into three sub-categories for domestic purposes – a strong typhoon, very strong typhoon and violent typhoon.

This article covers a list of systems developing in the Northwest Pacific basin that were classified by the JMA's category of a strong typhoon. The category of a strong typhoon ranges with 10-minute sustained winds of between 64 and 84 knots (118–116 km/h; 74–97 mph).

Systems
Key
 Discontinuous duration (weakened below a "Strong" typhoon then restrengthened to that classification at least once)

1990s

2000s

2010s

2020s

Climatology

See also

Typhoon
Pacific typhoon season
 Pacific typhoon season

References

External links
Japan Meteorological Agency

WPAC STY